Māngere East or Mangere East is a suburb of Auckland, New Zealand, under the governance of Auckland Council. It is located to the south of Favona, north of Papatoetoe, west of Middlemore, east of Māngere and Māngere Bridge, and southwest of Ōtāhuhu.

In 2019, the name of the suburb was officially gazetted as Māngere East.

Demographics

Māngere East had a population of 27,372 at the 2018 New Zealand census, an increase of 2,298 people (9.2%) since the 2013 census, and an increase of 3,051 people (12.5%) since the 2006 census. There were 5,721 households, comprising 13,641 males and 13,740 females, giving a sex ratio of 0.99 males per female, with 7,383 people (27.0%) aged under 15 years, 7,224 (26.4%) aged 15 to 29, 10,632 (38.8%) aged 30 to 64, and 2,145 (7.8%) aged 65 or older.

Ethnicities were 12.7% European/Pākehā, 15.9% Māori, 65.2% Pacific peoples, 20.1% Asian, and 1.1% other ethnicities. People may identify with more than one ethnicity.

The percentage of people born overseas was 41.7, compared with 27.1% nationally.

Although some people chose not to answer the census's question about religious affiliation, 15.1% had no religion, 63.1% were Christian, 1.8% had Māori religious beliefs, 6.6% were Hindu, 5.3% were Muslim, 1.2% were Buddhist and 2.0% had other religions.

Of those at least 15 years old, 1,974 (9.9%) people had a bachelor's or higher degree, and 4,461 (22.3%) people had no formal qualifications. 1,224 people (6.1%) earned over $70,000 compared to 17.2% nationally. The employment status of those at least 15 was that 9,780 (48.9%) people were employed full-time, 2,100 (10.5%) were part-time, and 1,269 (6.3%) were unemployed.

Education

All these schools except De La Salle are coeducational. Rolls are as of

Community facilities 
Tri Duc Temple, a Vietnamese Buddhist temple is located in the suburb.

Notable people
 William Massey – Prime Minister of New Zealand (1912–1925)
 Tupou Neiufi – Commonwealth Games and Paralympics athlete

References

Suburbs of Auckland
Māngere-Ōtāhuhu Local Board Area